The Judge John C. Sweeney House is a historic home located at 1212 Chickasaw Road, Paris, Henry County, Tennessee.

It was built in 1885 and added to the National Register in 1988.

References

Houses in Henry County, Tennessee
Historic districts on the National Register of Historic Places in Tennessee
National Register of Historic Places in Henry County, Tennessee